The first election to Fife Regional Council was held on 8 May 1974 as part of the wider 1974 Scottish regional elections. The election saw Labour winning control of the region's 42 seat council.

Aggregate results

Ward results

References

1974 Scottish local elections
1974
May 1974 events in the United Kingdom